Tongshan District, formerly Tongshan County is one of six districts of Xuzhou, Jiangsu province, People's Republic of China, bordering Anhui and Shandong provinces.

History 
Tongshan was originally knows as Pengcheng County, the latter merged into Xuzhou during the Yuan and the Ming dynasties, also in the early Qing. In 1733, as Xuzhou became a prefecture (fu) from an independent department (zhili zhou), its department proper was separated and renamed "Tongshan" (literally: copper-filled hill), which derives from an island in the Weishan Lake.

Tongshan was once the metropolitan county (shou xian) of Xuzhou, thus it referred to the prefecture since 1912, until the Japanese Army captured the county and made its urban area to be Xuzhou City in 1939.

The county was dissolved in 1952, but restored in the next year. It became a district since 2010.

Administrative divisions
In the present, Tongshan District has 8 subdistricts and 20 towns.
8 subdistricts

20 towns

References

www.xzqh.org 

County-level divisions of Jiangsu
Administrative divisions of Xuzhou